Michael Pickett (born 17 August 2002) is a New Zealand swimmer. He represented New Zealand at the 2019 World Aquatics Championships held in Gwangju, South Korea and he finished in 38th place in the heats in the men's 50 metre freestyle event.

In 2018, he competed in the boys' 50 metre freestyle at the Summer Youth Olympics held in Buenos Aires, Argentina. He also competed in the boys' 100 metre freestyle and mixed 4 × 100 metre freestyle relay events. In both the 50 metre and 100 metre events he advanced to the semi-finals and he did not advance to compete in the final.

References 

Living people
2002 births
Place of birth missing (living people)
New Zealand male freestyle swimmers
Swimmers at the 2018 Summer Youth Olympics
21st-century New Zealand people